Fernando Ponce de León París (Bogotá, September 6, 1917 – Bogotá, November 13, 1998) was a Colombian writer born within a large family of eleven siblings. He lived a childhood of deprivation despite belonging to aristocratic families in Colombia, but also filled with great experiences and solidarity with his brothers and sisters. Still waiting to be published, he left several written testimonies of this period of his life. The Ponce de León París family are direct descendants of the Spanish nobleman and hero José Martín París Álvarez.

Career
In 1947 he cofounded with his twin brother Carlos a small printing business, called Ponce de León Bros., that would become in time one of the most important companies in its trade, to the point that in 1997 was distinguished by the Chamber of Commerce of Bogotá with a special award for its quality and entrepreneurial efficiency.

A self-taught man, worked hard and studied to elevate his spirit and knowledge. A man of critical thinking, he did not permit his economic achievement to cloud his conviction that literature is a way to generate social conscience and understanding that life and the world have many faces. Said he:  " … the writer has a mission right beside freedom…."

During 50 years he created characters such as Matías and many others that live in his books, some came out of his imagination, others straight out of reality, but all of them plenty of poetry and tenderness, hope, frustration, bitterness and a wide range of  human emotions.  For Ponce de León a novel must be "the man with all his shortcomings."  In his books Ponce de León expands this idea; in each one of them his characters are portrayed with a deep understanding of their psychological make up, showing things and situations such as they are in real life, in spite of the critics and censorship to his approach. He is true to his beliefs in every word. In 1959, famous Colombian poet Eduardo Carranza  wrote: "Ponce de León is one of three or four authentic writers our literature can be proud of."

Works
In 1954 the first of his six novels came out. Tierra asolada (A devastated land) is a book that shows all the horrors of the bloody time known in Colombia as "The Violence", in which an undeclared civil war devastated the country and caused thousands of deaths. Said well known critic Juan Lozano y Lozano : "this book, more than a novel is a story of an anguishing and troublesome reality."

In 1958 Matías appeared. This is an urban novel, published by the Ministry of Culture of Colombia, twenty years after its first printing. The book depicts the life of a blind boy and the terrible travails and circumstances of such a person growing up in the sordid suburbs of Bogotá. The third edition of Matías was published in December 2009.

In 1959 La Castaña appeared, a rural novel exploring the life of a poor peasant trapped by poverty, injustice and a hopeless future.
In 1961, Ponce de León published a short novel called Cara o sello (Heads or tails) that narrates the tale of a kidnapping. It is a masterly description of the fears and difficulties of a man that fears to be kidnapped and has to confront this situation, but it is hard for the reader to discern if all the main character is going through is imagination or reality and if the kidnapping indeed occurs.

His only theater work is called  La libertad es mujer  (Freedom is a woman) which is a satirical play about politicians and newsmen and the plots they engage in.
His 1972 book La gallina ciega (The blind chicken) ended up a finalist in the international Premio Planeta Novel Contest award. In this book, Ponce de León returns to the theme of rural migration towards the cities and the hardships of men and women that become prisoners of them.
His last book in 1992 Las dos muertes de Antonino, (The two deaths of Antonino) is a fantasy that recreates the myth of the winged man; a man that tries to relive the memories of his childhood and convert them into his yearnings for freedom.

Ponce de León is a writer of the 20th century that is fresh reading for the 21st century.

References

External links
La gallina ciega (novel) by Fernando Ponce de Leon
About the novel Matías by Fernando Ponce de Leon (in Spanish)
The critic Juan Lozano y Lozano

1917 births
1998 deaths
People from Bogotá
Colombian male novelists
Colombian screenwriters
Postmodern writers
Colombian people of Spanish descent
Colombian twins
20th-century Colombian novelists
Male screenwriters
20th-century male writers
20th-century screenwriters